Nor Azli Yusoff was a Singaporean footballer who played as a midfielder in the Sleague.

Career 

He started his career with the Cheetahs before moving to the Protectors.  After his contract ended with Home United, he move to the Eagles in 2015 and stay on till now.

Honours

Club
Home United
Singapore Cup: 2013
S.League: 2013 Runners Up
Tanjong Pagar
Singapore League Cup: 2014 Runners Up

Career statistics

References 

1983 births
Living people
Singaporean footballers
Association football goalkeepers
Singapore Premier League players
Hougang United FC players
Home United FC players
Tanjong Pagar United FC players
Geylang International FC players